The 16587 / 16588 Yesvantpur–Bikaner Express is an Express  train belonging to Indian Railways South Western Railway zone that runs between  and  in India.

It operates as train number 16587 from Yesvantpur Junction to Bikaner Junction and as train number 16588 in the reverse direction, serving the states of Rajasthan, Gujarat, Maharashtra & Karnataka.

Coaches
The 16587 / 88 Yesvantpur Junction–Bikaner Junction Express has one AC-1 Tier, one AC 2-tier, three AC 3-tier, seven sleeper class, six general unreserved & two SLR (seating with luggage rake) coaches . It doesn't carry a pantry car.

As is customary with most train services in India, coach composition may be amended at the discretion of Indian Railways depending on demand.

Service

Routing

Traction
As the route is going to be electrified, a Krishnarajapuram-based WDP-4 / WDP-4B / WDP-4D diesel locomotive pulls the train to its destination.

Direction reversal
The train reverses its direction twice, at:
 
 .

References

External links
16587 Yesvantpur Junction - Bikaner Junction Express at India Rail Info
16588 Bikaner Junction - Yesvantpur Junction Express at India Rail Info

Express trains in India
Transport in Bikaner
Rail transport in Rajasthan
Rail transport in Gujarat
Rail transport in Maharashtra
Rail transport in Karnataka
Transport in Bangalore